Arkhontoula Volakaki (born 28 July 1979) is a Greek table tennis player. She competed in the women's singles event at the 2004 Summer Olympics.

References

1979 births
Living people
Greek female table tennis players
Olympic table tennis players of Greece
Table tennis players at the 2004 Summer Olympics
Place of birth missing (living people)